Starting in 1973, after The Dark Side of the Moon was released, Pink Floyd started using regular backing musicians. Many of the musicians that Pink Floyd used as backing musicians were part of the studio recordings of albums such as Dick Parry, who played saxophone on "Money" and The Blackberries who did the backing vocals for "Shine On You Crazy Diamond".

The Dark Side of the Moon Tour 1973
The Black Grass were backing musicians for the March and May 1973 performances. Nawasa Crowder was not present in the June 1973 concerts. The Blackberries provided backing vocals for two October 1973 performances while Vicki Brown, Liza Strike, and Clare Torry provided backing vocals for two November concerts held on the same day. The setlist usually consisted of "Obscured by Clouds", "When You're In", "Careful with That Axe, Eugene", "Echoes", "Set the Controls for the Heart of the Sun" (starting in mid-March), and "Childhood's End" (only a few performances) in first half and the entire The Dark Side of the Moon album in the second half, with "One of These Days" as the encore.

 Dick Parry – saxophone
 Black Grass (Nawasa Crowder, Mary Ann Lindsey, and Phyllis Lindsey) –  backing vocals
 The Blackberries (Billy Barnum, Venetta Fields, and Clydie King) –  backing vocals
 Vicki Brown, Liza Strike, and Clare Torry –  backing vocals

French Concert Series 1974
Dick Parry played saxophone while the Blackberries were the backing vocalists for seven June shows. The setlist consisted of "Shine On You Crazy Diamond", "Raving and Drooling" (an early version of "Sheep"), "Echoes" making up the first half and The Dark Side of the Moon making up the second.

 Dick Parry – saxophone
 The Blackberries (Venetta Fields & Carlena Williams) –  backing vocals

British Winter Tour 1974
Dick Parry and the Blackberries were additional musicians for the September, November and December shows. The setlist consisted of having a first half of "Shine On You Crazy Diamond", "Raving and Drooling", "You've Got to Be Crazy" (an early version of "Dogs") with the second half being The Dark Side of the Moon and "Echoes" as the encore.

 Dick Parry – saxophone
 The Blackberries (Venetta Fields & Carlena Williams) –  backing vocals

North American Tour 1975
Dick Parry and The Blackberries were the backing musicians for the April, June, and July shows. The first half of the setlist consisted of "Raving and Drooling", "You Gotta be Crazy", "Shine On You Crazy Diamond" (now split into two halves), "Have a Cigar" and the second half consisted of The Dark Side of the Moon, with "Echoes" as the encore.

 Dick Parry – saxophone
 The Blackberries (Venetta Fields & Carlena Williams) –  backing vocals

In the Flesh 1977
Dick Parry and Snowy White assisted Pink Floyd during the entire tour which lasted from January to July 1977. The setlist featured Animals in the first half and Wish You Were Here in the second, with "Money" and "Us and Them" the typical encores.

 Dick Parry – saxophones and additional keyboards
 Snowy White – guitars, bass (on "Sheep", "Pigs" and "Welcome to the Machine"), backing vocals

The Wall 1980–81
The Wall made up the entire shows during these two years. There were eighteen shows in 1980 during the months in the months of February and August. There were thirteen shows in 1981 in February and June. In 2000, Pink Floyd released Is There Anybody Out There? The Wall Live 1980–81 which was a CD made up of various concerts from 1980 and 1981.

1980
 Snowy White – guitars
 Andy Bown – bass guitar, acoustic guitar on "Outside the Wall"
 Peter Wood – keyboards, acoustic guitar on "Outside the Wall"
 Willie Wilson – drums, percussion
 Joe Chemay, Stan Farber, Jim Haas, Jon Joyce – backing vocals

1981
 Andy Roberts – guitars
 Andy Bown – bass guitar, acoustic guitar on "Outside the Wall"
 Peter Wood – keyboards, acoustic guitar on "Outside the Wall"
 Willie Wilson – drums, percussion
 Clive Brooks- drums, percussion (Nick Mason's drum tech; filled in for Wilson at first two London concerts)
 Joe Chemay, Stan Farber, Jim Haas, Jon Joyce – backing vocals

A Momentary Lapse of Reason 1987–1989
The Momentary Lapse Tour, according to Tim Renwick, was only supposed to last 11 weeks. Originally the band would play a show at Wembley Stadium, tour the United States of America, and finish back again at Wembley, much like what Roger Waters was doing on his Radio K.A.O.S. tour.

A Momentary Lapse of Reason Tour 1987
The tour began on 9 September 1987 at Lansdowne Park Ottawa Canada and finished at The B.C. Place Stadium in Vancouver Canada on 10 December 1987. The first half of the setlist consisted of "Echoes" (replaced by "Shine On You Crazy Diamond" from late September 1987 onward) followed by A Momentary Lapse of Reason with the second half made up of various Pink Floyd material from over the years.

 Jon Carin – keyboards and vocals
 Scott Page – saxophone and guitar
 Guy Pratt – bass guitar and vocals
 Tim Renwick – guitars and vocals
 Gary Wallis – percussion
 Rachel Fury and Margaret Taylor – backing vocals
 Durga McBroom – backing vocals (from November, 1987 onward (first performance was at Omni Arena in Atlanta in November, 1987)
 Roberta Freeman and Lorelei McBroom – additional backing vocals for the band's shows from Atlanta in November, 1987, for an aborted film.

World Tour 1988
The World Tour began at Western Springs in Auckland, New Zealand on Friday, 22 January 1988 and finished at the Nassau Coliseum, Long Island on 23 August 1988. The first half of the setlist consisted of "Shine On You Crazy Diamond" followed by A Momentary Lapse of Reason with the second half made up of various Pink Floyd material from over the years. A recording of this set can be found on the Delicate Sound of Thunder live album.

 Jon Carin – keyboards and vocals
 Scott Page – saxophone and guitar
 Guy Pratt – bass guitar and vocals
 Tim Renwick – guitars and vocals
 Gary Wallis – percussion
 Rachel Fury, Durga McBroom and Margaret Taylor – backing vocals

Another Lapse 1989
In the Spring and Summer of 1989, the band did another European leg of the tour dubbing it "Another Lapse". They toured during May, June, July 1989. The setlist remained the same as the 1988 World Tour.

 Jon Carin – keyboards and vocals
 Scott Page – saxophone and guitar
 Guy Pratt – bass guitar and vocals
 Tim Renwick – guitars and vocals
 Gary Wallis – percussion
 Rachel Fury, Durga McBroom and Lorelei McBroom – backing vocals

Knebworth Festival Benefit Concert 1990
On 30 June 1990, Pink Floyd performed for the Knebworth Festival benefit concert. Pink Floyd's setlist included "Shine On You Crazy Diamond (Part I–V)", "Sorrow", "Wish You Were Here", "The Great Gig in the Sky", "Money", "Comfortably Numb", and "Run Like Hell".

 Candy Dulfer – saxophone
 Jon Carin – keyboards and vocals
 Guy Pratt – bass guitar and vocals
 Tim Renwick – guitars and vocals
 Gary Wallis – percussion
 Michael Kamen – keyboards (on "Comfortably Numb")
 Durga McBroom, Sam Brown, Vicki Brown, Clare Torry – backing vocals

King Edward VII Hospital Benefit Concert 1993
On 18 September 1993, Pink Floyd played a three piece set for the King Edward VII Hospital. The band performed "Run Like Hell", "Wish You Were Here", and "Comfortably Numb".

 Tim Renwick – guitars
 Gary Wallis – percussion
 Mike Rutherford – bass guitar
 Paul Young – vocals, tambourine (on "Run Like Hell")
 Adrian Milne – keyboards, backing vocals

The Division Bell Tour 1994
The Division Bell tour lasted from March to October 1994. The first half of the setlist on shows where The Dark Side of the Moon was not played in its entirety would consist of material from The Division Bell and A Momentary Lapse of Reason plus "Astronomy Domine" and "One of These Days". The second half made up of various Pink Floyd material from The Dark Side of the Moon, Wish You Were Here, The Wall and The Division Bell. On shows where all of Dark Side was played in the second set, the first half of the setlist consisted of material from The Division Bell, A Momentary Lapse, The Wall, Wish You Were Here and Meddle with the second half being The Dark Side of the Moon with encores of "Wish You Were Here", "Comfortably Numb", and "Run Like Hell". A recording of this tour can be found on P•U•L•S•E.

 Dick Parry – saxophone
 Jon Carin – keyboards and vocals
 Guy Pratt – bass guitars and vocals
 Tim Renwick – guitars
 Gary Wallis – percussion
 Durga McBroom, Sam Brown, Claudia Fontaine – backing vocals

Live 8 Concert 2005
On 2 July 2005, Pink Floyd reunited with Roger Waters to help promote awareness of global poverty. The setlist was "Speak to Me" / "Breathe" / "Breathe (Reprise)", "Money", "Wish You Were Here", and "Comfortably Numb".

 Jon Carin – keyboards, vocals, slide guitar (on "Breathe")
 Dick Parry – saxophone (on "Money")
 Tim Renwick – guitars, bass (on "Wish You Were Here")
 Carol Kenyon – backing vocals (on "Comfortably Numb")

The Madcap's Last Laugh: Syd Barrett tribute concert 2007
On 10 May 2007 Pink Floyd (Wright, Gilmour and Mason) took part in a Syd Barrett tribute concert in London performing "Arnold Layne", while Roger Waters performed "Flickering Flame". Wright, Gilmour and Mason also participated on performance of the song "Bike" with most of the other performers of the evening.

 Jon Carin – keyboards, vocals
 Andy Bell – bass

References

 Backing
Pink Floyd Backing